Shirpala shelter is a mountain shelter positioned in Alborz mountains, north of metropolitan Tehran, Iran.

It is situated at the elevation of 2750 meters above sea level and is accessible via a route passing through Sarband, Pas-Ghaleh and Abshar Dogholu. It usually takes 3 to 4 hours to ascend to mount Tochal from this shelter. This shelter was made by Iranian Mountain Climbing Federation with the help of Iranian Boy Scout Association. The shelter has some basic facilities such as restaurants, snack bars, few private rooms and two public dormitories.

Folklore 
It is believed that Kai Kobad, mythical Iranian king had lived in a fort located in Shirpala before ascending to the throne with the help of Rostam another Iranian mythical figure.

See also 
 Abshar Dogholu

References 

Mountains of Iran
Mountaineering in Iran
Mountains of Tehran Province